Schineni is a commune in Soroca District, Moldova. It is composed of two villages, Schineni and Schinenii Noi.

References

Communes of Soroca District